Picchalli Srinivas is an Indian singer, music director, theatre personality and activist, known for his works in Kannada. Apart from numerous folk songs, Srinivas has sung a few film songs. For his song "Dodda Gowdara" in the movie Amasa, he won the Karnataka State Film Award for Best Male Playback Singer in 2003-04. He also served as the President of Karnataka Janapada Akademi, the State's top institution for folk and performing arts.

Career 
Srinivas started his career as folk singer in plays along with acting in theatre. His folk songs were gained recognition for him. Songs like "Ee Nada Manninalli", "Entha Chandada Nagarahavu", "Yatakke Male Hodavo", "Kattutheva Navu" and are well received by the audience. Songs written by Siddalingaiah and Kotiganahalli Ramaiah are mostly rendered by Srinivas and became popular.

His film songs including "Dodda Gowdara" (Amasa), "Dharegene Dodda Vamsha" (Neela), "Elli Hodavo Kannige Kanadadavo" (Maathaad Maathaadu Mallige) are popular.

Srinivas served as the Chairperson of the Karnataka Jaanapada Akademi.

Discography 
Selected film songs recorded by Srinivas, are listed here.

All songs are in Kannada

Accolades 
 Dr. B. R. Ambedkar Award by Karnataka Government
 2003-04 – Karnataka State Film Award for Best Male Playback Singer for the song "Dodda Gowdara" from Amasa
 Janapada Akademi Award 
 2014 - President at the 10th Bangarpet Taluk Kannada Sahitya Sammelana

References

External links 
 

Kannada playback singers
Indian male folk singers
Year of birth missing (living people)
Living people